African Convention (CA) was a political party in French West Africa, originally formed at a meeting in Dakar on 11 January 1957. The CA consisted of the Senegalese Popular Bloc (BPS) of Léopold Sédar Senghor, the African Popular Movement of Nazi Boni in Upper Volta, and the Nigerien Democratic Front (FDN) of Zodi Ikhia in Niger.

In the 1957 territorial assembly elections, CA member parties won 96 seats. CA won in Senegal, and gained presence in three other assemblies.

In March 1958 the African Convention and the African Socialist Movement (MSA) merged to form the African Regroupment Party (PRA).

References

Zuccarelli, François. La vie politique sénégalaise (1940-1988). Paris: CHEAM, 1988.
1958 disestablishments in French West Africa
1957 establishments in French West Africa
African and Black nationalist parties in Africa
Pan-African organizations
Pan-Africanist political parties in Africa
Political parties disestablished in 1958
Political parties established in 1957
Political parties in French West Africa
Transnational political parties